Giulia Lacedelli (born 22 March 1971 in Cortina d'Ampezzo) is an Italian curler. She started playing curling in 1986 and currently plays lead on the Italian National Women's Curling Team skipped by Veronica Zappone. She competed at the 2006 Winter Olympics as the third for Diana Gaspari.

References

External links

1971 births
Curlers at the 2006 Winter Olympics
Italian female curlers
Living people
Olympic curlers of Italy